Beatley may refer to:

 Charles E. Beatley (1916–2003), American politician
 Clara Bancroft Beatley (1858–1923), American educator, lecturer, author
 Janice C. Beatley (1919–1987), American botanist
 Timothy Beatley, sustainable city researcher and author
 William Beatley (1923–2005), British fencer